Rosalie Blum is a 2015 French comedy-drama film written and directed by Julien Rappeneau in his directorial debut. The film is based on a graphic novel series of the same name by Camille Jourdy. It stars Noémie Lvovsky, Kyan Khojandi and Alice Isaaz.

Synopsis
Vincent Machot was living an ordinary life, divided between his hair salon, his cousin, his cat and his intrusive mother. With a very reserved character, his romantic life was limited to missed visits with his friend, who had been living in Paris for several months and was not keen to meet up again. He met Rosalie Blum by chance, a manager of a small business, a solitary and mysterious woman, whom Vincent was convinced he had met before. But where? Intrigued, he decided to follow her everywhere she went in the hope of knowing more, and he found her entering a prison. Rosalie eventually noticed that Vincent was everywhere she went and asked her niece, Aude, an idle and lazy student, to help her watch Vincent. Aude, who invited her two whimsical friends to help her, became the head of the mission to discover more about Vincent. The three of them gathered clues, suspecting Vincent of evil intent and the construction of criminal theories, pretending they were the protagonists of a police show. After many meticulous investigations, the characters will not be what one would believe, and everyone's personal lives will unveil when the barriers between them are removed.

Cast 
 Noémie Lvovsky as Rosalie Blum
 Kyan Khojandi as Vincent Machot
 Alice Isaaz as Aude Cerceau
 Anémone as Simone Machot
 Philippe Rebbot as The room-mate
 Sara Giraudeau as Cécile
 Camille Rutherford as Laura
 Nicolas Bridet as Laurent
 Grégoire Oestermann as Aude's father
 Aude Pépin as Aude's sister

Filming locations
Most of the scenes were filmed in Nevers in Bourgogne-Franche-Comté between March and April 2015. The end scenes were filmed in Leffrinckoucke in the Nord the month after.

Accolades

References

External links 
 

2015 films
2015 comedy-drama films
2010s French-language films
French comedy-drama films
Films based on French comics
Live-action films based on comics
2015 directorial debut films
2010s French films